Sal of Singapore is a 1928 American silent drama film directed by Howard Higgin. At the 2nd Academy Awards in 1930, Elliott J. Clawson was nominated for an Academy Award in the category Best Writing (Adapted Screenplay). Complete prints of the film exist. The film's sets were designed by the art director Edward C. Jewell.

Cast
 Phyllis Haver as Sal
 Alan Hale as Captain Erickson
 Fred Kohler as Captain Sunday
 Noble Johnson as Erickson's 1st Mate
 Dan Wolheim as Erickson's 2nd Mate
 Jules Cowles as Cook
 Pat Harmon as Sunday's 1st Mate
 Harold William Hill as Baby

References

External links
 

1928 films
1928 drama films
Silent American drama films
American silent feature films
American black-and-white films
Films directed by Howard Higgin
Films based on Australian novels
Seafaring films
Pathé Exchange films
Surviving American silent films
1920s American films
Silent adventure films